Buls Bay is a bay  wide, which indents the east side of Brabant Island just north of D'Ursel Point, in the Palmer Archipelago. It was discovered by the Belgian Antarctic Expedition under Gerlache, 1897–99, and named by him for Charles Buls, a supporter of the expedition.

Further reading 
  International Symposium on Antarctic Earth, Geological Evolution of Antarctica, Sciences 5th : 1987 : Cambridge, England, P 516

External links 

 Buls Bay on USGS website
 Buls Bay on AADC website
 Buls Bay on SCAR website
 Buls Bay Copernix satellite image
 Buls Bay satellite image
 Buls Bay updated weather forecast

References 

Bays of the Palmer Archipelago